is a former Japanese football player and manager. He played for Japan national team.

Club career
Tezuka was born in Tochigi Prefecture on September 4, 1958. After graduating from Chuo University, he joined Fujita Industries in 1981. The club won the league champions in 1981. He retired in 1991. He played 167 games and scored 42 goals in the league.

National team career
On June 11, 1980, when Tezuka was a Chuo University student, he debuted for Japan national team against China. He played at 1986 World Cup qualification, 1986 Asian Games and 1988 Summer Olympics qualification. He played 25 games and scored 2 goals for Japan until 1988.

Coaching career
After retirement, Tezuka started coaching career at Fujita Industries (later Bellmare Hiratsuka, Shonan Bellmare) in 1991. He moved to Mito HollyHock in 2003. In 2005, he moved to Thespa Kusatsu and became a manager. In 2007, he signed with Japanese Regional Leagues club Fagiano Okayama. He promoted the club to Japan Football League in 2008 and J2 League in 2009. In 2010, he moved to Fukushima United FC and managed until 2011.

Club statistics

National team statistics

Managerial statistics

References

External links

Japan National Football Team Database

1958 births
Living people
Chuo University alumni
Association football people from Tochigi Prefecture
Japanese footballers
Japan international footballers
Japan Soccer League players
Shonan Bellmare players
Japanese football managers
J2 League managers
Thespakusatsu Gunma managers
Fagiano Okayama managers
Fukushima United FC managers
Association football forwards